Jonathan David Anthony Bowden (12 April 1962 – 29 March 2012) was an English painter, novelist, essayist, playwright, actor, orator and activist. Initially a Conservative, he later became involved in far-right organisations such as the British National Party. Bowden has been described as a "cult Internet figure" in the far-right, even after his death.

Life and career

Early life and formal education 

Bowden was born in Kent, England, and attended Presentation College in Reading, Berkshire. He described his experience there:I went to a Catholic school, and they educated me very well. And almost every book in that library was by a dead White European male. And almost everything that one learnt culturally — from the rather gory sort of Grünewald-type crucifixion as you went in, to the Dalí on the wall, the reverse crucifixion scene, in reverse perspective from above, that was next to the assembly point, and to everything else — everything was European.His mother suffered from severe mental illness, and died when Bowden was 16 years old.

Bowden was largely self-educated. In 1984, he completed one year of a Bachelor of Arts history degree course at Birkbeck College, London University, as a mature student, but left without graduating. He subsequently enrolled at Wolfson College, Cambridge University, in autumn 1988, but left after a few months. He became a personal friend of Bill Hopkins during this time.

Conservative Party
Bowden began his political career as a member of the Conservative Party in the Bethnal Green and Stepney Constituency Association.. In 1990, he joined the Conservative Monday Club, and the following year made an unsuccessful bid to be elected onto its Executive Council. In 1991, he was appointed co-chairman with Stuart Millson of the club's media committee, and was also active in the Western Goals Institute. In 1992, Bowden was expelled from the Monday Club.

Revolutionary Conservative Caucus
Bowden and Stuart Millson co-founded the Revolutionary Conservative Caucus in November 1992 with the aim of introducing "abstract thought into the nether reaches of the Conservative and Unionist party". The group published a quarterly journal entitled The Revolutionary Conservative Review. By the end of 1994, Millson and Bowden parted company and the group dissolved.

In 1993, Bowden published the book Right through the European Books Society. He was also reported to be a prominent figure in the creative milieu responsible for the emergence of Right Now! magazine.

Freedom Party
Bowden then joined the Freedom Party, for which he was treasurer for a short time, and subsequently was a member of the Bloomsbury Forum, in company with Adrian Davies.

British National Party
In 2003, Bowden broke with attempts to influence Conservatism and moved into political activity by joining the British National Party (BNP). He was appointed Cultural Officer, a position its leader Nick Griffin created to give Bowden officer status within the organisation. In July 2007, Bowden resigned and left the BNP. Although he resumed public speech-making at BNP organised meetings in the localities away from the party's national events, he never re-joined the party and cut all ties after the May 2010 general election. 

Bowden became a popular speaker; many of his speeches are recorded and have been transcribed. Topics of his lectures include: Martin Heidegger, Bill Hopkins & the angry young men, Wyndham Lewis, Robinson Jeffers, historical revisionism, Friedrich Nietzsche, Marxism & the Frankfurt School, Hans-Jürgen Syberberg, Thomas Carlyle, H. P. Lovecraft, Léon Degrelle, Nineteen Eighty-Four, Maurice Cowling, Stewart Home, Robert E. Howard, Julius Evola, Savitri Devi, T. S. Eliot, feminism, W. B. Yeats, "Tragedy, Horror & the Transcendent", Yukio Mishima, Gabriele D'Annunzio, Punch and Judy, Ezra Pound, Vanguardism, the Soviet Gulag, and Charles Maurras.

In late 2011 and early 2012, Bowden made fourteen appearances on Richard B. Spencer's Vanguard podcast. Spencer re-released the episodes in January 2018 as a series entitled Bowden!. The episode titles are "Essence of the Left", "The Uses and Abuses of Nietzsche", "The European New Right", "Creative Destruction" (libertarianism, anarchy, inequality and Ayn Rand), "Iran, Israel, and The Bomb", "Democracy", "The Feminist Mystique" (an allusion to The Feminine Mystique), "On the Genealogy of Morals", "Frankfurt School Revisionism" (critical theory, cultural Marxism and political correctness), "The Homosexual Question", "The Forgotten War" (Iraq War), "Understanding Spengler", "Politics, Politics" (the 2012 GOP primaries), and "The E Word" (eugenics).

Death 
In 2012, Bowden died of heart failure at his home in Berkshire at the age of 49, shortly after being released from the psychiatric ward of a hospital, where he was admitted after suffering a mental breakdown.

Views
The ideas that Bowden held to be true include that some hierarchies are good for society, that "liberalism is moral syphilis" and that native Europeans are justified in asserting their cultural, ethnic, psychological and spiritual hegemony over Europe.

Bowden stated that he believed Liberalism two-dimensional, too materialistic, and "not at all deep", and never chose to become a Marxist because of his belief that life is inherently inegalitarian, and that inequality is inherently good, which Marxists were afraid to admit. 

Bowden espoused pagan religious beliefs. He was particularly influenced by Heraclitus, claiming his philosophy was synonymous with Heraclitus' view on energy.

Bibliography

Works 
Mad (London: Avant-Garde Publishing, 1989); (Nine-Banded Books, 2009) 
Aryan (London: Egotist Press, 1990)
Sade (London: Egotist, 1992); (Nine-Banded Books, 2013) 
Brute (Egotist Press, 1992)
Skin (London: Egotist Press, 1992)
Axe (London: Egotist, 1993); (London: The Palingenesis Project, 2014). 
Craze (London: Egotist Press, 1993) 
Right (London: European Books Society 1994); (London: The Palingenesis Project, 2016) 
Collected Works, 6 vols. (London: Avant-guarde, 1995)
Standardbearers – British Roots of the New Right, edited by Adrian Davies, Eddy Butler & Jonathan Bowden; Beckenham, Kent, 180pps, (April 1999)
Apocalypse TV (London: The Spinning Top Club, 2007). 
The Art of Jonathan Bowden (1974–2007) (London: The Spinning Top Club, 2007). 
The Fanatical Pursuit of Purity (London: The Spinning Top Club, 2008). 
Al-Qa’eda Moth (London: The Spinning Top Club, 2008). 
Kratos (London: The Spinning Top Club, 2008). 
A Ballet of Wasps (London: The Spinning Top Club, 2008). 
Goodbye Homunculus! (London: The Spinning Top Club, 2009). 
The Art of Jonathan Bowden, Vol. 2 (1968–1974) (London: The Spinning Top Club, 2009). 
Lilith Before Eve (London: The Spinning Top Club, 2009). 
Louisiana Half-Face (London: The Spinning Top Club, 2010). 
The Art of Jonathan Bowden, Vol. 3 (1967–1974) (London: The Spinning Top Club, 2010). 
Our Name Is Legion (London: The Spinning Top Club, 2011). 
Colonel Sodom Goes to Gomorrah (London: The Spinning Top Club, 2011). 
Locusts Devour a Carcass (London: The Spinning Top Club, 2012). 
Spiders Are Not Insects (London: The Spinning Top Club, 2012). 
Pulp Fascism (San Francisco: Counter-Currents, 2013). 
Western Civilization Bites Back (San Francisco: Counter-Currents, 2014). 
Demon (London: The Palingenesis Project, 2014). 
Blood (London: The Palingenesis Project, 2016). 
Heat (London: The Palingenesis Project, 2017). 
Deathlock (London: The Palingenesis Project, 2017). 
Extremists: Studies in Metapolitics (San Francisco: Counter-Currents, 2017). 
Why I Am Not a Liberal (Imperium Press, 2020).

Filmography

References

External links

Official website on the Wayback Machine
The Jonathan Bowden Archive
BOWDEN! on Spreaker
Jonathan Bowden Archive on YouTube, featuring all known recordings of Bowden's speeches and lectures

1962 births
2012 deaths
Alt-right
British National Party politicians
People from Kent
English far-right politicians
English modern pagans
Adherents of Germanic neopaganism
Modern pagan artists